The Flight of the Earls took place in September 1607, when Hugh O'Neill, 2nd Earl of Tyrone, and Rory O'Donnell, 1st Earl of Tyrconnell, and about ninety followers, left Ulster in Ireland for mainland Europe. Their permanent exile was a watershed event in Irish history, symbolising the end of the old Gaelic order.

Name

The event was first named as a "flight" in  a book by the Reverend C. P. Meehan that was published in 1868.

Historians disagree to what extent the earls wanted to start a war with Spanish help to re-establish their positions, or whether they accepted exile as the best way of coping with their recent loss of status since the Treaty of Mellifont in 1603. Meehan argued that the earls' tenants wanted a new war: "Withal, the people of Ulster were full of hope that O'Neill would return with forces to evict the evictors, but the farther they advanced into this agreeable perspective, the more rapidly did its charms disappear."

Background to the exile

After the defeat at the Battle of Kinsale in 1601, Hugh Roe O'Donnell of Tyrconnell traveled to Spain to seek support from Philip III. Unsuccessful, he died in Spain and was succeeded by his younger brother Rory O'Donnell.

The O'Neills and O'Donnells retained their lands and titles, although with much diminished extent and authority. However, the countryside was laid bare in a campaign of destruction in 1602, which induced famine in 1603. Hugh O'Neill, Earl of Tyrone, was pardoned under the terms of the Treaty of Mellifont in March 1603 and submitted to the crown.

When King James VI and I took the English throne in 1603, he quickly proceeded to issue pardons for the Irish lords and their rebel forces. Already reigning as king of Scotland, he had a better understanding of the advantages from working with local chiefs in the Scottish Highlands. However, as in other Irish lordships, the 1603 peace involved O'Neill losing substantial areas of land to his cousins and neighbours, who would be granted freeholds under the English system, instead of the looser arrangements under the former Brehon law system. This was not a new policy but was a well-understood and longstanding practice in the Tudor conquest of Ireland.

On 10 September 1602, the Prince of Tyrconnell had already died, allegedly assassinated, in Spain, and his brother succeeded him as 25th Chieftain of the O'Donnell clan. He was later granted the Earldom of Tyrconnell by King James I on 4 September 1603, and restored to a somewhat diminished scale of territories in Tyrconnell on 10 February 1604.

In 1605, the new Lord Deputy of Ireland, Sir Arthur Chichester, began to encroach on the former freedoms of the two Earls and The Maguire, enforcing the new freeholds, especially that granted in North Ulster to the O'Cahan chief. The O'Cahan had formerly been important subjects of the O'Neills and required protection; in turn, Chichester wanted to reduce O'Neill's authority. O'Cahan had also wanted to remove himself from O'Neill's overlordship. An option was to charge O'Neill with treason if he did not comply with the new arrangements. The discovery of the Gunpowder Plot in the same year made it harder for Catholics to appear loyal to both the crown and the papacy. A lengthy legal battle however found in O'Neill's favour.

By 1607, O'Neill's allies the Maguires and the Earl of Tyrconnell were finding it hard to maintain their prestige on lower incomes. They planned to seek Spanish support before news of the Battle of Gibraltar arrived. When their ship dropped anchor, O'Neill seems to have joined them on impulse. He had three options:
 Flee with his friends and hope for a reinvasion by Spain
 Go to London and stay at court until his grievances were redressed
 Do nothing and live on a reduced income as a large landowner in Ulster.

Fearing arrest, they chose to flee to Continental Europe, where they hoped to recruit an army for the invasion of Ireland with Spanish help. However, earlier in 1607 the main Spanish fleet in Europe had been destroyed by the Dutch in the Battle of Gibraltar. But the oft-repeated theory that they were all about to be arrested contradicts Tadhg Ó Cianáin, the main historical source on the Flight, who said at the start of his account that O'Neill heard news of the ship anchored at Rathmullen on Thursday 6 September, and "took his leave of the Lord Justice (Chichester) the following Saturday". They had been meeting at Slane for several days, and there is no proof that warrants for his arrest had been drawn up, nor was it a hurried departure.

Also, as the Anglo-Spanish War (1585–1604) had been ended by the Treaty of London in 1604, King Philip III of Spain wanted to remain at peace with England under its new Stuart dynasty. As a part of the peace proposals, a Spanish princess was to marry James' son Henry, though this never happened. Spain had also gone bankrupt in 1598. Tyrone ignored all these realities, remained in Italy, and persisted with his invasion plan until his death in exile in 1616.

End of the old Gaelic order

The earls left from the town of Rathmullan with some of the leading Gaelic families in Ulster; they travelled down Lough Swilly on a French ship. Their departure was the end of the old Gaelic order, in that the earls were descended from Gaelic clan dynasties that had ruled their parts of Ulster for centuries. The Flight of the Earls was a watershed event in Irish history, as the ancient Gaelic aristocracy of Ulster went into permanent exile. Despite their attachment to and importance in the Gaelic system, the Earls' ancestors had accepted their Earldoms from the English-run Kingdom of Ireland in the 1540s, under the policy of surrender and regrant. Some historians argue that their flight was forced upon them by the fallout from the Tudor conquest of Ireland, others that it was an enormous strategic mistake that cleared the way for the Plantation of Ulster.

From 1616 a number of bards outside Ulster had a poetic debate in the "Contention of the bards", and one of the arguments celebrated King James's Gaelic-Irish Milesian ancestry through Malcolm III of Scotland. So it is debatable whether the Gaelic order had ended or was evolving.

The journey
The Earls set sail from Rathmullan, a village on the shore of Lough Swilly in County Donegal, accompanied by ninety followers, many of them  Ulster noblemen, and some members of their families. Several left their wives behind, hoping either to return or retrieve them later. The late Tomás Cardinal Ó Fiaich, Archbishop of Armagh, gave a lecture at Rathmullan in September 1988 and recounted that the Earl of Tyrone allegedly “had a gold cross which contained a relic of the True Cross, and this he trailed in the water behind the ship, and according to O’Ciainain, it gave some relief from the storm” during the crossing to Quillebeuf-sur-Seine in Normandy, France. They finally reached the Continent on 4 October 1607. This supposed relic of the True Cross was probably a minor relic taken from that kept at Holy Cross Abbey, which they had previously visited en route to Kinsale in 1601.

Their destination was Spain, but they disembarked in France. The party proceeded overland to Spanish Flanders, some remaining in Leuven, while the main party continued to Italy. Tadhg Ó Cianáin (sometimes quoted by historians as O'Keenan) subsequently described the journey in great detail. While the party were welcomed by many important officials in the Spanish Netherlands, he makes no mention of any negotiations or planning between the earls and the Spanish to start a new war to regain the earls' properties.

Ó Cianáin's diary is important as the only continuous and contemporaneous account of the Flight. Its original title, Turas na dTaoiseach nUltach as Éirinn – the departure of the Chiefs of Ulster from Ireland – has been changed since the creation of the more dramatic phrase "Flight of the Earls" to the latter's modern literal translation, Imeacht na nIarlaí; and, according to Professor Ó Muraíle, turas can also mean a religious pilgrimage.

The attainders

King James issued "A Proclamation touching the Earles of Tyrone and Tyrconnell" on 15 November 1607, describing their action as treasonous, and therefore preparing the ground for the eventual forfeiture of their lands and titles. No reply that is known of was made to the proclamation

Their titles were attainted in 1614, although they continued to be recognised on the Continent. The attainders were not considered legitimate in continental Catholic countries of the day. Even within the context of English and colonial Irish rule, the attainder came about six years after Rory, 1st Earl of Tyrconnell, had already died. As accused, for him to have been properly tried, he should have been tried by his peers in the Peerage of Ireland, under the presiding authority of the Lord High Steward of Ireland.  However, he was already dead, unable to stand in his own defence, and his title already inherited by his son Hugh “Albert” O'Donnell; therefore in order to attaint the title, the trial would have to have been of Hugh “Albert”, who had in fact committed no crime. The 6-year delay in hearing the attainders was unavoidable, as his peers in the Irish House of Lords next sat in 1613, and dealt with the matter in the usual manner.

The attainder was however considered a travesty of justice by his supporters, and was considered null and void by many on the Continent. The succession of the Earl of Tyrconnell's son, Hugh “Albert” O'Donnell, as 2nd Earl of Tyrconnell (1st creation) was therefore recognized as valid in the Spanish Empire, and he was given the same status under a new Spanish title Conde de Tirconnel.

Under the Common law, the title granted by King James and accepted by the earl had potentially lapsed as soon as the Earl embarked on the ship without his king's permission to leave Ireland, and when it lapsed it could not then pass down to his descendants without some special waiver. Assuming that Hugh Albert was being punished for a crime he did not commit, and was not being given a hearing, misses the whole point of the law of attainder. Hugh Albert was never issued a Writ of Summons to sit in the Irish House of Lords as his father's heir. Hugh Albert also never came to Dublin in 1614 to argue his case for a waiver, so far as is known, and never accepted James I as his king. Until he did so, his title and his claim to nobility were considered to be "in abeyance".

These attainders had a much greater impact on the people of Ulster. The 1603 peace arrangement with the three lords was ended, as they had broken its conditions by leaving the kingdom without permission, and their remaining freehold lands were confiscated. Chichester proposed a new plantation of settlers from England, Wales and Scotland, sponsored in part by the City of London merchants, which became known as the Plantation of Ulster. This had an enormous negative impact on the lower class Gaelic-culture inhabitants of Ulster.

Change in Spanish policy
In the Papal bull  of 1555, the Pope had conferred the title King of Ireland on King Philip II of Spain when he was married to Queen Mary. Philip II made no claim to the kingship of Ireland after Mary's death in 1558. He engaged in a lengthy war from 1585 with her sister Elizabeth I, and he and his successor Philip III supported the Irish Catholic rebels up to the siege of Kinsale in 1601. He had been offered the kingship in 1595 by O'Neill and his allies, but turned it down. Given this lengthy support, it was reasonable for O'Donnell and O'Neill to imagine that they might solicit help from Philip III, but Spanish policy was to maintain the recent (1604) Treaty with England, and its European fleet had been weakened from several conflicts, and destroyed at the Battle of Gibraltar by the Dutch over four months earlier.

Therefore, by mid-1607 Spain had neither the desire nor the means to assist an Irish rebellion. While the Flight is often described as a first step in arranging a new war, this must be seen as an emotional and false conclusion, as there were no plans or proposals at all from the Spanish side to support the earls. Spanish policy in the 1590s had been to help the Irish warlords as a nuisance against England, but they had been defeated by 1603. It could not be in any way in the interest of Spain to assist their unsuccessful former allies in 1607.

Commemoration on the 400th anniversary

The 400th anniversary of the Flight of the Earls was marked on 14 September 2007, throughout Donegal, including a regatta of tall ships, fireworks, lectures, and conferences.  The President of Ireland Mary McAleese unveiled a statue by John Behan depicting the Flight at Rathmullan. There is a permanent exhibition dedicated to the Flight of the Earls and the subsequent Plantation in Draperstown in Northern Ireland and at the "Flight of the Earls Centre" in the Martello tower at Rathmullan.
There were also commemorative postage stamps issued by the Irish post office , featuring Hugh O'Neill, Earl of Tyrone and Rory O'Donnell, Earl of Tyrconnell, and based on original illustrations by Sean O Brogain, made as they were about to sail out of Rathmullan.

In 2008 there were also celebrations to mark the 400th anniversary of the arrival of the Earls in Rome, with a celebratory performance by the Cross Border Orchestra of Ireland in Sant'Ignazio Church in Rome.

See also
Tudor conquest of Ireland
Contention of the bards
O'Cahan
Tadhg Ó Cianáin
"The Hunting of the Earl of Rone"
Regiment of Hibernia

References

External links
 "Stamps commemorate flight of the earls", The Irish Times, Feb 23, 2007,

Further reading
Turas na dTaoiseach nUltach as Éirinn from Ráth Maoláin to Rome: Tadhg O Cianáin's contemporary narrative of the so-called ‘Flight of the Earls’, 1607–8, Nollaig Ó Muraíle, Four Courts Press, Dublin, October 2007
The Flight of the Earls, An Illustrated History, 2007, by Dr. John McCavitt FRHistS.
The Life of Hugh Roe O'Donnell, Prince of Tyrconnell (Beatha Aodh Ruadh O Domhnaill) by Lughaidh Ó Cléirigh. Edited by Paul Walsh and Colm Ó Lochlainn. Irish Texts Society, vol. 42. Dublin: Educational Company of Ireland, 1948 (original Gaelic manuscript in the Royal Irish Academy in Dublin).
Annals of the Kingdom of Ireland (Annála Ríoghachta Éireann) by the Four Masters, from the earliest period to the year 1616, compiled during the period 1632–1636 by Brother Michael O’Clery, translated and edited by John O'Donovan in 1856, and re-published in 1998 by De Burca, Dublin.
Vicissitudes of Families, by Sir Bernard Burke, Ulster King of Arms, published by Longman, Green, Longman and Roberts, Paternoster Row, London, 1861. (Chapter on O’Donnells, pages 125–148).
The Fate and Fortunes of the Earls of Tyrone (Hugh O’Neill) and Tyrconnel (Rory O’Donel), their flight from Ireland and death in exile, by the Rev. C. P. Meehan, M.R.I.A., 2nd edition, James Duffy, London, 1870.
The O’Donnells of Tyrconnell – A Hidden Legacy, by Francis Martin O'Donnell, published by Academica Press LLC in London and Washington, D.C., 2018, (750 pages). 
Vanishing Kingdoms – The Irish Chiefs and Their Families, by Walter J. P. Curley (former US Ambassador to Ireland), with foreword by Charles Lysaght, published by The Lilliput Press, Dublin, 2004 [ & ]. (Chapter on O'Donnell of Tyrconnell, page 59).
A View of the Legal Institutions, Honorary Hereditary Offices, and Feudal Baronies established in Ireland, by William Lynch, Fellow of the Society of Antiquaries, published by Longman, Rees, Orme, Brown, and Green, Paternoster Row, London, 1830 (O’Donnell: page 190, remainder to Earl's patent).

External links 

Earls Heritage Centre, Rathmullan, County Donegal
 Wild Geese Heritage Museum and Library
The Flight of the Earls: escape or strategic regrouping? at History Ireland
Mural depicting Flight of the Earls, Belfast
Yearlong Commemoration of Flight of the Earls  (1607–2007) 2007 – Donegal County Council/County Development Board
The Flight Of The Earls Dr John McCavitt FRHistS
Information on the Flight of the Earls
BBC History article
The National Library of Ireland's current exhibition, Strangers to Citizens: the Irish in Europe, 1600–1800
Flight of the Earls?: changing views on O’Neill's departure from Ireland

 
1607 in Ireland
O'Neill dynasty
O'Donnell dynasty
Nine Years' War (Ireland)